Johnny Mooring was a Canadian fiddler.  He was born in Springhill, Nova Scotia, Canada, on May 17, 1927  to Henry and Caroline Mooring.  He was the ninth of ten children.

Mooring learned the rudiments of playing the fiddle from his mother - and from the time he first picked up the instrument it became an extension of the man for the rest of his life.

At the age of 12, Mooring started playing the fiddle for parties.  He remembered his early beginnings and humble ancestry by carrying with him throughout his life the first payment he ever received... 35 cents.

He became one of the most respected fiddle players in North America, winning the North American Fiddle Championship Trophy, in Shelburne, Ontario, Canada, for three consecutive years: 1964-66.  Judges remarks included references to his ability to translate a waltz (e.g. The Twilight Waltz, The Dauphin Waltz) with such intense emotion.

During his lifetime he released twelve record albums and appeared on many radio and television shows including The Don Messer and Tommy Hunter shows. He was an enthusiastic composer of fiddle tunes and tried his hand at writing songs.  He sings and plays fiddle on the album, "Four Strings and I". Apart from the fiddle he also played piano, organ, accordion, banjo, mandolin, clarinet and trumpet. Brian Buchanan of Enter the Haggis wrote that Mooring "was arguably the first 'rock star' of traditional Canadian music."

Mooring had two daughters, Sandra and Sharon Mooring, and four grandchildren and seven great grandchildren.

Mooring was injured in a fight on March 24, 1974 in a parking lot in Rivière-Beaudette, Quebec, and died four days later at Ottawa Centre Hospital.  In her book, "Mountain City Girls: The McGarrigle Family Album", Anna McGarrigle provided an account of the incident, saying that, after a performance he was followed into the parking lot by two men and beaten to death for perceived flirtation with a girl who was with them.  (McGarrigle, Anna & Jane, "Mountain City Girls", Random House  Canada, 2015, retrieved from https://books.google.com/books?id=WnSEBwAAQBAJ&pg=PT303&lpg=PT303&dq=who+killed+johnny+mooring+fiddler&source=bl&ots=3jn-yL_KLH&sig=ACfU3U2C64ecsN0tVU5XAtKY-MM115W7QA&hl=en&sa=X&ved=2ahUKEwibhsDP-4jkAhUGLK0KHa15D1oQ6AEwCHoECAcQAQ#v=onepage&q=who%20killed%20johnny%20mooring%20fiddler&f=false on August 16, 2019)

References 

Canadian murder victims
Canadian singer-songwriters
1927 births
1974 deaths
20th-century Canadian male singers
Canadian folk fiddlers
20th-century Canadian violinists and fiddlers
20th-century Canadian male musicians
Canadian male violinists and fiddlers
People from Cumberland County, Nova Scotia